Tom Reynolds (born 1960 in Wisconsin) is an American author and television producer. He wrote the popular books I Hate Myself and Want to Die and Touch Me, I'm Sick. He also wrote Wild Ride: How Outlaw Motorcycle Myth Conquered America. This book was based on his 1999 documentary.  He currently lives in Nacogdoches, Texas, where he teaches Speech and English at Stephen F. Austin State University.

Books
He wrote the popular books I Hate Myself and Want to Die and Touch Me, I'm Sick. He also wrote Wild ride: how outlaw motorcycle myth conquered America.

Television
In 1996, he transitioned into television, writing and producing over 90
hours of TV programming, including documentaries and non-fiction specials for A&E, Dick
Wolf Productions, Travel Channel, E! Entertainment, and Warner Brothers Television. He produced several television programs including documentaries including The Wild Ride of Outlaw Bikers (1999). He was also a writer on Illuminating Angels & Demons (2005).

Notes

External links

Living people
People from Nacogdoches, Texas
Stephen F. Austin State University faculty
Writers from California
Writers from Texas
Writers from Wisconsin
1960 births